The Tenants is a 2005 film drama directed by Danny Green and starring Dylan McDermott and Snoop Dogg. It is based on the 1971 novel The Tenants by Bernard Malamud.

Premise
In an abandoned tenement, a militant African-American writer and a Jewish novelist develop a friendship while struggling to complete their novels before the landlord forceably evicts them, but interpersonal tensions rise between the tenants and escalate into violence.

Cast
Dylan McDermott as Harry Lesser
Snoop Dogg as Willie Spearmint
Rose Byrne as Irene Bell
Seymour Cassel as Levenspiel
Niki J. Crawford as Mary Kettlesmith
Aldis Hodge as Sam Clemence
Gene Gilbert as Mr. Ross
Linda Lawson as Anna

References

External links 
 
  
 
 Box Office Information

2005 films
2005 drama films
Films based on American novels
Nu Image films
2000s English-language films
American drama films
2000s American films